Mohammad Abdul Latif (Died: 18 September 2013) was a  Major General of Bangladesh Army. He served as the Director General of Bangladesh Rifles from 24 September 1990 to 8 June 1992.

Career 
Mohammad Abdul Latif served as the Director General of Bangladesh Rifles from 24 September 1990 to 8 June 1992. He was the accused in the murder case of Major General Manzur.

References 

2013 deaths
Year of birth missing
Director Generals of Border Guards Bangladesh
Bangladesh Army generals
Bangladeshi military personnel